The Crai-EPs 1993/1994 is a compilation of two EPs released by the band Catatonia; For Tinkerbell (the first five tracks) and Hooked (the last three tracks).
The tracks "For Tinkerbell", "Gyda Gwen" (Welsh version of "New Mercurial Heights") and "Sweet Catatonia" later appeared on the album Way Beyond Blue as newly recorded versions. "Gyda Gwen" as a secret track at the end of the record.

The Hooked portion of this compilation had already been previously released in 1995 as part of another EP compilation by the band titled The Sublime Magic of Catatonia.

Track listing

Personnel
 Cerys Matthews – vocals
 Mark Roberts – guitar
 Clancy Pegg – keyboards
 Paul Jones – bass
 Dafydd Ieuan – drums

References 

1998 EPs
Catatonia (band) compilation albums